The Kavoshgare Khalij Fars is a hydrographic and oceanographic research vessel built in 2017 by the Iranian Defense Ministry's Marine Industries Organization for the Iranian National Institute for Oceanography and Atmospheric Science.

References 

Ships built at Shahid Mousavi shipyard
Survey ships
Research vessels
Ships of Iran